Roan is a former municipality in Trøndelag county, Norway. The municipality existed from 1892 until its dissolution in 2020 when it joined Åfjord Municipality. It was part of the Fosen region along the coast.  The administrative centre of the municipality was the village of Roan.  Other villages included Bessaker, Brandsfjord, and Hofstad.

A large wind park is located on the mountain plateau just southeast of Bessaker.

At the time of its dissolution in 2020, the  municipality was the 248th largest by area out of the 422 municipalities in Norway. Roan was the 399th most populous municipality in Norway with a population of 953.

General information

The municipality of Roan was established on 1 June 1892 when the old municipality of Bjørnør was divided into three separate municipalities: Roan (population: 2,069), Osen (population: 1,575), and Stoksund (population: 1,122).

On 1 January 2018, the municipality switched from the old Sør-Trøndelag county to the new Trøndelag county.  On 1 January 2020, the neighboring municipalities of Roan and Åfjord merged into one large municipality called Åfjord.

Name
The municipality (originally the parish) is named after the old Roan farm since the first Roan Church was built there. The name is probably derived from the Old Norse word  which means "pole" a reference to a mountain peak behind the farm.

Coat of arms
The coat of arms was granted on 22 May 1987 and it was in use until 1 January 2020 when the municipality was dissolved. The official blazon is "Azure, three terns volant argent". This means the arms have a blue field (background) and the charge is a group of three flying terns. The bird design has a tincture of argent which means it is commonly colored white, but if it is made out of metal, then silver is used. Terns, a very watchful and energetic bird, are intended to symbolize the local inhabitants and the coast with the vast bird life in the area. The arms were initially designed by Solfrid Krogfjord with the final design by Einar H. Skjervold. The municipal flag has the same design as the coat of arms. After the municipal merger on 1 January 2020, these arms were adopted as the arms for the new Åfjord Municipality.

Churches
The Church of Norway had one parish within the municipality of Roan. It is part of the Fosen prosti (deanery) in the Diocese of Nidaros.

Geography

Roan was located on the Fosen peninsula between the municipalities of Åfjord (to the south) and Osen (to the north), with Namdalseid to the east.  Roan also included a number of islands in the Atlantic Ocean to the west.  Three major fjords cut into the landscape: the Brandsfjorden in the north, Bersfjorden in the central part, and the Skjørafjorden in the south.  The Kaura lighthouse was located on a small island in the mouth of the Brandsfjorden.  The Hellfjorden is a small fjord arm that branches off the main Brandsfjorden.

Government
While it existed, this municipality was responsible for primary education (through 10th grade), outpatient health services, senior citizen services, unemployment and other social services, zoning, economic development, and municipal roads. During its existence, this municipality was governed by a municipal council of elected representatives, which in turn elected a mayor. The municipality fell under the Fosen District Court and the Frostating Court of Appeal.

Municipal council
The municipal council of Roan is made up of 17 representatives that are elected to four year terms.  The party breakdown of the final municipal council was as follows:

Mayors
The mayors of Roan:

1892–1907: John Hopstad (MV/V)
1908–1919: Johan Stinessen (V)
1920–1922: Henrik Guttelvik (V)
1923–1925: Johan Stinessen (V)
1926–1931: Anton Lindbak Nilssen (Bp)
1932–1937: Menelai Næss (V)
1938–1945: Anton Lindbak Nilssen (Bp)
1946–1951: Kristian Strøm (KrF)
1952–1959: Anton Lindbak Nilssen (Bp)
1960–1963: Hans Viken (H)
1964–1979: Magnar Wiik (Ap)
1980–1985: Johan Nerdal (Sp)
1986–1987: Jan Utkilen (H)
1988–1991: Henning Martinsen (H)
1992–1995: Erling Eian (H)
1995–1999: Henning Martinsen (H)
1999–2003: Oddvar Dahl (Sp)
2003–2011: Albert Larsen (H)
2011–2015: Jan Helge Grydeland (Sp)
2015–2019: Einar Eian (H)

Population
Almost all the inhabitants lived along the coast or in the Hofstaddalen valley.  The islands were all generally uninhabited with few exceptions.  The island of Brandsøya, which has a bridge connecting it to the mainland, has some inhabitants.  There are only two roads leaving the municipality: one going south to Å in Åfjord and one to Osen.

See also
List of former municipalities of Norway

References

External links

Municipal fact sheet from Statistics Norway 

 
Åfjord
Former municipalities of Norway
1892 establishments in Norway
2020 disestablishments in Norway
Populated places disestablished in 2020